Jones! is an entertainment channel on New Zealand's Sky Television on Channel 8 that shows classic back catalogue of US and UK programming.

The US content is sourced from the CBS Studios International catalogue as part of the exclusive contract deal Sky did for the first-run shows on Prime which includes shows such as Cheers, Columbo, The Wonder Years, Mork and Mindy, the Star Trek franchises, Shōgun, The Bionic Woman, The Love Boat, Kojak, Happy Days, Charlie's Angels, TJ Hooker, Bonanza, and Twin Peaks.

The UK content is sourced from both BBC Worldwide and ITV Studios, which includes shows such as Dad's Army, It Ain't Half Hot Mum, The Good Life, Porridge, Minder and Thunderbirds.

Jones! too

Jones! too launched on Channel 208 on 1 July 2017.

See also
Dave (TV channel)

External links

Television channels in New Zealand
Television channels and stations established in 2013
English-language television stations in New Zealand